Ayoub is the Arabic name of the biblical figure Job.

Ayoub or Ayyoub or Ayub or Ayoob and other variants is also a given name and a surname. Eyüp is the Turkish variant of the same name. Ejub is the Bosnian variant of the same name.

Given name

Ayoub
Ayoub Abdellaoui (born 1993), Algerian footballer
Ayoub Azzi (born 1989), Algerian footballer 
Ayoub Baninosrat, Iranian wrestler
Ayoub Barzani, Kurdish writer and critic
Ayoub Boukhari (born 1997), Dutch footballer of Moroccan descent
Ayoub El Jamal (born 1992), Moroccan director and filmmaker
Ayoub El Kaabi (born 1993), Moroccan footballer
Ayoub Latrèche (born 1989), Algerian footballer 
Ayoub Odisho (born 1960), Iraqi Assyrian footballer
Ayoub Ouadrassi (born 1991), Moroccan footballer
Ayoub Al-Mas (born 1978), Emirati swimmer
Ayoub Mousavi (born 1995), Iranian weightlifter 
Ayoub Murshid Ali Saleh, Yemeni citizen held in extrajudicial detention in the U.S. Guantanamo Bay detainment camps, in Cuba
Ayoub Pourtaghi (born 1973), Iranian amateur boxer  
Ayoub Rachane (born 1988), Moroccan footballer
Ayoub-Farid Michel Saab (or just Farid Saab) (born 1939), Lebanese banker
Ayoub Sørensen (born 1988), Danish-Moroccan footballer
Ayoub Tabet (1884–1951), Lebanese Protestant politician and acting president of Lebanon during the French Mandate of Lebanon from 18 March to 22 July 1943
Ayoub Zolfagari (born 1959), Iranian footballer

Ayyoub
Ayyoub Allach (born 1998), Belgian-born Moroccan footballer

Ayoob

Ayub

Ayub Khan, a number of individuals with the name

Eyüp

Surname

Ayoub
Ahmed Ayoub (born 1971), Egyptian footballer
Elizabeth Ayoub, Venezuelan singer and actress of Lebanese descent
François Ayoub (1899–1966), Syrian Archbishop of the Maronite Catholic Archeparchy of Aleppo
George Ayoub (born 1963), Australian professional rugby union referee
Joelle Ayoub (born 2002), Trablos el-Mina
Liam Ayoub, Lebanese-Australian rugby league player
Lucy Ayoub (born 1992), Israeli television presenter, poet and radio host
M. M. Ayoub, Egyptian Professor of Industrial Engineering 
Mouna Ayoub (born 1957), French socialite and businesswoman of Lebanese origin
Nawal Ayoub Colombian beauty queen of Lebanese ancestry 
Philippe Ayoub, Canadian bilingual actor  
Sam Ayoub, Australian rugby league player-manager
Samiha Ayoub, Egyptian actress
Serge Ayoub (born 1964), French activist of Lebanese descent associated with the French extreme right
Souheil Ayoub (born 1936), Lebanese fencer
Susanne Ayoub (born 1956), Austrian-Iraqi writer, journalist and filmmaker
Wadi Ayoub (1927–1976), Lebanese Greco–Roman style wrestler best known as Sheik Ali, in Australia and internationally
Yassin Ayoub (born 1994), Moroccan-Dutch footballer
Salahuddin Ayyub (1138–1193), Sultan of the Ayyubid dynasty, Liberator of Jerusalem. Kurdish-Syrian(Levant) descent

Ayyoub
Ali Abdullah Ayyoub (born 1952), Syrian politician, senior Syrian Arab Army officer
Habib Ayyoub (born 1947), Algerian writer
Tareq Ayyoub (1968–2003), Palestinian Arab television reporter

Ayoob